Armageddon March Eternal (Symphonies of Slit Wrists) is the fourth studio album by Swedish death metal band The Project Hate MCMXCIX.

Track listing 
 "At the Entrance to Hell's Unholy Fire" – 08:13
 "The Bleeding Eyes of a Breeding Whore" – 09:32
 "I See Nothing but Flesh" – 07:57
 "Resurrected for Massive Torture" – 08:16
 "We Couldn't be Further From the Truce" – 08:25
 "Godslaughtering Murder Machine" – 08:42
 "Symphony of the Deceived" – 08:45
 "Loveless, Godless, Flawless" – 05:45

References 

2005 albums
The Project Hate MCMXCIX albums